Compassvale LRT station is an elevated Light Rail Transit (LRT) station on the Sengkang LRT line East Loop in Compassvale, Sengkang, Singapore, located at Compassvale Street between the junctions of Compassvale Crescent, Compassvale Road and Punggol Road.

Etymology
This station is named after the estate, Compassvale within Sengkang New Town which, like Rivervale and Anchorvale, follow the seafaring theme. Despite its name, Compassvale Bus Interchange is not located near this station, but near to Sengkang MRT/LRT station.

History
The station opened on 18 January 2003, along with the rest of the Sengkang LRT line East Loop.

References

External links

Railway stations in Singapore opened in 2003
Light Rail Transit (Singapore) stations
Compassvale
LRT stations in Sengkang